Németh is a Hungarian surname. In Hungarian, német means "German" (the word has Slavic origin, literally meaning "he does not speak", since German is not a Slavic language); the h is a remnant of obsolete Hungarian spelling, as frequently found in names, especially in families of noble origin. Alternate spellings include "Nemeth", "Neimeth", "Német", "Nemath", "Namath", "Nameth", "Nemet" and "Nimitz".  The name is also common in Austria and Germany.  It is an uncommon given name. People with the name or its variants include:

People
Németh
 Angéla Németh (born 1946), Hungarian track and field athlete
 Dániel Németh (photographer) (born 1975), Hungarian photographer
 Gyula Németh (born 1890), linguist
 Gyula Németh (born 1959), athlete
 Imre Németh (1917 – 1989), Hungarian athlete, mainly hammer throw
 János Németh (1906 – 1988), Hungarian water polo player
 John Németh (born 1975), American blues and soul harmonicist, singer, and songwriter
 Károly Németh (disambiguation), several people
 Krisztián Németh (born 1989), Hungarian football player
 László Németh (1901 – 1975), Hungarian writer
 Miklós Németh (born 1948), Hungarian politician
 Miklós Németh (sportsman) (born 1946), Hungarian Olympic javelin throw
 Noémi Németh (born 1986), Hungarian hammer thrower
 Pál Németh (1937 – 2009) Hungarian athlete and coach for hammer throw, father of Zsolt Németh
 Roland Németh (born 1974), Hungarian runner
 Sándor Németh (1925-1993), Hungarian swimmer
 Szilárd Németh (born 1977), ethnic Hungarian professional Slovak footballer
 Virág Németh (born 1985), Hungarian professional tennis player
 Zsolt Németh (born 1971), Hungarian hammer thrower, son of Pál Németh
 Zsuzsanna Németh (born 1953), Hungarian politician
Német
 László Német (born 1956), a Societas Verbi Divini monk

Nemeth
 Abraham Nemeth (1918-2013), American mathematician and inventor
 Evi Nemeth (1940–2013), American engineer, author and teacher 
 Nick Nemeth (born 1980), American professional wrestler better known as Dolph Ziggler
 Ryan Nemeth (born 1985), American professional wrestler (brother of Nick)
 Patrik Nemeth (born 1992) Swedish professional ice hockey player
 Steve Nemeth (born 1967), Canadian ice hockey player
 Steve Nemeth (gridiron football) (1922–1998), American player of gridiron football
 Christopher Nemeth (1959–2010), British fashion designer

Namath
 Joe Namath (born 1943), American football quarterback

Nemet
 Istvan Nemet (born 1942), New Zealand association footballer
 Klaus-Peter Nemet (born 1953), German football coach
 Marina Nemet (1960-2010), Croatian actress

Nimitz
Chester W. Nimitz US Navy Admiral. Namesake of the USS Nimitz

References

See also
Surnames meaning "German" of different origins:

 Douch (English)
 Němec (Czech)
 Tedesco (surname) (Italian)

Hungarian-language surnames
Ethnonymic surnames